Viktor Sergeyevich Mirolyubov (22 January 1860, in Moscow, Russian Empire – 26 October 1939, in Leningrad, USSR) was a Russian journalist, editor and publisher. Having started out as an opera singer (who up until 1897 performed, as V.Mirov, at the Bolshoi Theatre), he became widely known for his work as a head of Zhurnal Dlya Vsekh (Journal for Everyone, 1898–1906), originally a minor publication which he then bought out to turn into one of the leading literary Russian magazines of the time. In 1901 Mirolyubov became a co-founder (along with Dmitry Merezhkovsky and Zinaida Gippius among others) of the Religious-Philosophic Meetings (1901–1903).

After the 1917 Revolution Viktor Mirolyubov, encouraged and supported by Maxim Gorky (whom he became friends with in the early 1900s, while working for Znanie Publishers), remained in the Soviet Russia. He worked as an editor, later librarian, eventually became unemployed and died in poverty in 1939.

See also
Znanie Publishers

References 

Russian journalists
Russian editors
Russian opera singers
Singers from Moscow
1860 births
1939 deaths
Writers from Moscow